Copaken Brooks, formerly Copaken, White & Blitt is a privately owned full-service commercial real estate developer headquartered in Kansas City, Missouri that acquires, develops, leases, manages and sells various types of commercial assets within the Midwest for its clients and investors.

History
The firm was founded by Herman Copaken in 1922.

In the 1950s, three brothers-in-law – Paul Copaken, Lewis White and Irwin Blitt – took over the company.

In the 1960s and 1970s the company developed several shopping centers including Mission Center Mall, Oak Park Mall as well as the Eastland Mall in Bloomington, Illinois, Hickory Point Mall in Forsyth, Illinois, and Rockaway Townsquare in Rockaway, New Jersey. 

The company also sold the property to Sprint and Black & Veatch Corporation to build their corporate headquarters in Overland Park, Kansas. In 2008, it developed the headquarters for Applebee's.

In 2013, the company won the Greater Kansas City Chamber of Commerce "Mr. K" Small Business of the Year award.

Notable properties
Town Pavilion
1201 Walnut
Plaza Colonnade
Corrigan Station I & II
ARTerra
Midwest Gateway Industrial
City Center Lenexa
Renaissance Office Park (College & Metcalf)
Market Square Center
Creekwood Commons
Western Auto Building

External links
Emporis profile
 Official Website

References

Real estate companies established in 1922
Real estate companies of the United States
Companies based in Kansas City, Missouri
1922 establishments in Missouri